Abdel Aziz Abdel Shafy (Arabic : عبد العزيز عبد الشافي) (commonly known as Zizo) is an Egyptian manager and football director (born on December 25, 1952), who was a former striker and coach.

Football career

Club career
Zizo played within Al Ahly youth ranks since the age of 15. He became a member of the senior team when he was 17.

He spent ten years with Al Ahly, scoring over 100 goals for the club through all ranks.

He was dubbed one of the most talented footballers in the history of Egyptian football, but had to retire at the age of 27 due to a serious injury.

International career
Zizo played about 32 matches with his national side Egypt.

He is one of very few Egyptian footballers to make his Egypt debut at the age of 17.

He scored on his debut against German Democratic Republic in a friendly match in 1969.

Managing career

Egypt

After he retired in 1982, Zizo was immediately appointed football director for Al Ahly, winning the CAF Champions League in 1982.

He worked as an assistant manager to Mahmoud El-Gohary for the Egypt first team in the early 1990s. He won the 1992 Arab Nations Cup in Syria with the team. Zizo also coached the Egypt Olympic team in 1999.

He managed several Egyptian clubs including Al-Ittihad Al-Sakndary, Al-Masry, Baladeyet Al-Mahalla, Al-Mokawloon Al-Arab and Asmant Suez.

Zizo led Baladeyet Al-Mahalla to the final of Egyptian Cup in 2002 for the first and only time in the club's history.

He had three different spells as Al Ahly interim coach, as he guided the club to the 2015 Egyptian Super Cup which was staged in the United Arab Emirates for the first time.

In the 2016–2017 season, Zizo, who was the club's head of football sector, played a vital role in Al Ahly's Egyptian Premier League victory, as he left the team 7 points clear on top of the table during his spell as interim manager.

Saudi Arabia

In Saudi Arabia, Zizo worked with Al-Ahli Jeddah between 1986 and 1987. He won the KSA Youth Championship title & Regional title with the club in 1987.

A few years later, he joined rivals Al Ittihad as he won the KSA Youth Championship title in 1993.

Lebanon

In Lebanon, Zizo won the Lebanese Premier League with Nejmeh in 2004 and 2005.

He also won the Lebanese Super Cup and Lebanese Elite Cup.

Managerial statistics

Honors
Footballer

With Al Ahly:

7 Egyptian Premier League in 1974–75, 1975–76, 1976–77, 1978–79, 1979–80, 1980–81 and 1981–82

2 Egyptian Cup in  1978 and 1981

As Football Director

with Al Ahly:

CAF Champions League 1982

3 Egyptian Cup titles in 1982, 1983, 1984

As Manager

With Al Ahly:

 Egyptian Super Cup 2015

With Nejmeh:

 Lebanese Premier League 2004, 2005, 2008
 Lebanese Super Cup 2004
 Lebanese Elite Cup 2004, 2005

References

 http://www.ahlyegypt.com/club/stars/zizo
 https://web.archive.org/web/20070308203128/http://www.nejmeh.com/teams/technicalstaff-2003-2004.html
 https://web.archive.org/web/20100919161314/http://arabia.eurosport.com/football/egyptian-league/2009-2010/%D9%86%D8%AC%D9%88%D9%85-%D9%84%D8%A7-%D8%AA%D9%86%D8%B7%D9%81%D8%A6-%D8%B2%D9%8A%D8%B2%D9%88_sto2248458/ar-story.shtml

Egyptian footballers
Egypt international footballers
Al Ahly SC players
Expatriate football managers in Lebanon
Lebanese Premier League managers
Nejmeh SC managers
1952 births
Living people
Egyptian Premier League players
Association football forwards
Egyptian football managers
Al Ahly SC managers
African Games bronze medalists for Egypt
African Games medalists in football
Footballers at the 1973 All-Africa Games